Pennerton West (April 11, 1913 – June 29, 1965) was an American artist best known for her prints.

Biography
West was born on April 11, 1913 in New York City. West was descended from the American historical landscape painter Benjamin West. She was married to John Herma.

She studied at the Art Student's League and Cooper Union in New York City. She also studied with artists Hans Hoffman, Stanley William Hayter and Ibram Lassaw. 

She was affiliated with Atelier 17 in Paris, an avant-garde workshop founded by Hayter in 1927.

West died on June 29, 1965 in Shrub Oak, New York.

Selected works 
 Vase of Flowers (1945/1965)
 On Such a Night (1946)
 Standing Female Nude (n.d.)
 Untitled (n.d.)
 Woman Crouching (n.d.)

Selected exhibitions

Group exhibitions 

 Atelier 17, Grace Borgenicht Gallery, New York, NY, September 24-October 14, 1951
 Nine Women Painters, Bennington College Gallery, Bennington, VT, March 20-April 2, 1953

Solo exhibitions 

 Norlyst Gallery, New York, NY, October 1947
 De Nagy Gallery, New York, NY, September 1951
 De Nagy Gallery, New York, NY, January 1953
 Condon Riley Gallery, New York, NY, November 1958
 Willard-Lucien Gallery, New York, NY, April 19-May 7, 1960

References

Further reading 
 Nine Women Painters exhibition program at Bennington College Library

1913 births
1965 deaths
Atelier 17 alumni
Artists from New York City
Art Students League of New York alumni
Cooper Union alumni
20th-century American printmakers
20th-century American women artists